Relativity is the debut studio album by American rock band Emarosa. It was released on July 8, 2008 through Rise Records. Relativity was produced by Kris Crummett, producer of other bands such as Drop Dead, Gorgeous and Fear Before, whom Jonny Craig worked with on Dance Gavin Dance's debut album the year before.

This is the band's first recording with vocalist Jonny Craig during a period away from Dance Gavin Dance. It is also the album feature rhythm guitarist Jonas Ladekjaer. The album peaked at No. 191 on the Billboard 200 as well as 33 on the Top Independent Albums.

An unreleased demo of the project included alternative versions of the tracks "Pretend.Release.The Close" and "Set It Off Like Napalm".

Track listing

Personnel

Emarosa
 Jonny Craig – lead vocals
 ER White – lead guitar
 Jonas Ladekjaer – rhythm guitar
 Will Sowers – bass
 Lukas Koszewski – drums
 Jordan Stewart – keyboards

Additional personnel
 Kris Crummett – production, engineering, mixing, mastering, audio engineering, audio production
 Eric Rushing and Brett Bair (The Artery Foundation) – management
 Jeremy Holgersen (The Agency Group) – booking
 Synapse Design – art direction, design
 Roxanne Hartridge – photography

References

External links
 [ Relativity at Billboard.com]

2008 debut albums
Emarosa albums
Rise Records albums
Albums produced by Kris Crummett